Thompson's Block is located in Madison, Wisconsin. It was listed on the National Register of Historic Places in 1984 and on the State Register of Historic Places in 1989.

References

Commercial buildings on the National Register of Historic Places in Wisconsin
National Register of Historic Places in Madison, Wisconsin
Buildings and structures in Madison, Wisconsin
Italianate architecture in Wisconsin
Commercial buildings completed in 1868